The UWF Television Championship, promoted by the Universal Wrestling Federation, started out as the Mid-South Television Championship in 1984 and was then represented by a medal. It was renamed when Mid-South Wrestling changed its name to the UWF in 1986 and the title medal was replaced by a belt. The TV title was the mid-level wrestlers' title during its existence.  The title's final appearance was during Nikita Koloff's interview on the November 28, 1987 edition of World Championship Wrestling, with Koloff then declaring the NWA TV Title was the only TV Title.

Title History

See also
Universal Wrestling Federation
NWA World Television Championship

References

Mid-South Wrestling championships
Universal Wrestling Federation (Bill Watts) championships
Television wrestling championships